The New Generation Party – Christian Democratic (Partidul Noua Generație - Creștin Democrat, PNGCD; formerly Partidul Noua Generație, PNG) was a nationalist political party in Romania.

Created in 2000 as a centrist grouping around former Mayor of Bucharest Viorel Lis, it was taken over in January 2004 by businessman Gigi Becali (owner of FC Steaua București), who became its leader. Its ideology has since changed to extreme nationalism and Orthodox Christianity. Since then, it has pursued a radically nationalistic, xenophobic and homophobic scheme. In the 2004 legislative elections, PNG won 2.2% of the popular vote but no seats in the Chamber of Deputies and Senate.

For the 2009 European Parliament election, the PNGCD forged an electoral alliance with the far-right Greater Romania Party (PRM). PNGCD leader Becali was elected member of the European Parliament on the PRM list. The party's ideology under Becali's leadership is close to the one of the pre-war fascist Iron Guard (or "Legionary Movement"). It fuses nationalist mythology with Christian Orthodox conservatism. Becali is a self-declared follower of the Legionary Movement. The Romanian National Council for Combating Discrimination has repeatedly charged Becali with homophobic, sexist and discriminatory statements against Romani and other ethnic minorities. The United States Department of State has described the New Generation Party as an "extreme nationalist party" and noted the party's use of a slogan of the 1930s anti-Semitic Legionary Movement.

Notable members
Dan Pavel - executive president, former advisor of Gigi Becali, political science professor.  
Alex Mihai Stoenescu - vice president, historian.
Marian Oprea - vice president, talk-show host (on DDTV) and owner of Lumea (international politics magazine).

Electoral history

Legislative elections 

Notes:

1 PNG-CD competed on PNL ballot.

Presidential elections

European elections 

Notes:

1 PNG-CD competed on PRM ballot.

See also
:Category:New Generation Party (Romania) politicians

References

External links
Official site

2000 establishments in Romania
Christian democratic parties in Europe
Conservative parties in Romania
Eastern Orthodox political parties
Nationalist parties in Romania
Registered political parties in Romania
Political parties established in 2000
Right-wing populist parties
Romanian nationalist parties
Right-wing parties in Romania